Niederdorf is a municipality in South Tyrol in northern Italy, about  northeast of Bolzano.

Geography
Niederdorf borders the following municipalities: Prags, Toblach, Welsberg-Taisten, and Gsies.

History

Coat-of-arms
The emblem is per fess and the base per pale. The first show a sable eagle double-headed on or; in the second and third a half steinbock to face each other of or and sable. It’s the insignia of the Lords of Kurz von Thurn who ruled the village from 13th to 18th century. The emblem was granted in 1966.

Society

Linguistic distribution
According to the 2011 census, 92.09% of the population speak German, 7.76% Italian and 0.15% Ladin as first language.

References

External links
 Homepage of the municipality 

Municipalities of South Tyrol